Kindergarden (KG) is an annual demo party first organized in 1994 in Fjellfoten, Norway. During the first few years it was held irregularly, eventually settling into being an annual event. Since 2001 it has been held in Haga, Norway, the location also used for Kindergarden 4 and 5. 

Kindergarden is currently the oldest, still running demoparty which purely focuses on the demoscene, only beaten by the three big computer-parties Assembly, The Gathering and Euskal Encounter.

History 
Kindergarden started out as a small get-together between friends that culminated into Kindergarden 1 being organized at a small kindergarten at Fjellfoten, Norway, 24.-25. September 1994.  After the first party it was obvious that the next event would need a larger location, and so the second and third parties, named Kindergarden 4 and 5, were held at Haga samfunnshus in nearby Haga, Norway.  Because the party kept growing Kindergarden was organized at several other places for the next few years, until it returned to Haga Samfunnshus in 2001, where it has been continuously organized ever since.

Originally a pure Amiga party, Kindergarden solely accepted entries on this computer platform. With the declining size of the Amiga scene in the late 90s, however, PC-compos were added in 2000, and since then the party has catered to all platforms while maintaining a pure demoscene focus.

Events

References

External links
Official website
Kindergarden on Pouët
Kindergarden at The C-64 scene database

Demo parties
Recurring events established in 1994